Guzmania jaramilloi is a species of plant in the family Bromeliaceae. It is endemic to Ecuador.  Its natural habitats are subtropical or tropical moist lowland forests and subtropical or tropical moist montane forests.

References

Flora of Ecuador
jaramilloi
Least concern plants
Taxonomy articles created by Polbot